Illogan was an electoral division of Cornwall in the United Kingdom which returned one member to sit on Cornwall Council between 2009 and 2021. It was abolished at the 2021 local elections, being succeeded by Illogan and Portreath.

Councillors

Extent
Illogan represented the villages of Illogan and West Tolgus, including much of Tehidy Woods. The division was nominally abolished and reconstituted in boundary changes at the 2013 elections, but this had little effect on the ward. Before boundary changes, the division covered 733 hectares in total; afterwards, it covered 793 hectares.

Election results

2017 election

2014 by-election

2013 election

2009 election

Notes

References

Electoral divisions of Cornwall Council